The Chandragiri River, also known as the Perumpuzha River, is the longest river in Kasaragod district, Kerala, India. It was named after the Mauryan emperor Chandragupta Maurya.

The 17th-century Chandragiri Fort is located on the river. The Perumpuzha River is considered the traditional boundary between the Tulu Nadu and Malayalam regions of Kerala from the 14th century AD onwards; before that it was north of Kumbala.
 The river originates in the Talakaveri Wildlife Sanctuary in the Western Ghats of Kodagu district, Karnataka. It flows through towns including Sullia, Jalsoor, Parappa, Adoor, Chengala, and Kasaragod, where it flows into the Arabian Sea. 
In Sullia taluk, it is the major water source for domestic and agricultural purposes.

Course
The Chandragiri River originates from the northern slopes of the Greater Talacauvery National Park in the Western Ghats at the Kodagu district, Karnataka. Initially the river flows through the Malenadu region of Karnataka passing the Pushpagiri Wildlife Sanctuary and flowing through several hilly towns in Kodagu and Dakshina Kannada like Adyadka, Biliyar, Parivarkana, Paladka, Sullia, Pilikodi and Kanyana. Chandragiri then enters Kerala and flows through several hilly towns in the eastern part of the Kasaragod district, namely Panjikkal, Kottyadi, Adhur,  Poovadka, Kottamkuzhy, Bethurpuzha, Kundamkuzhy, Kolathur, Muliyar and Bovikanam. At Bovikanam its major tributary, Kudumbur River merges with Perumpuzha. Then the river enters into the Malabar plains where it flows through Thekkil, Chengala, Chattanchal, Perumbala, Chemnad and Kasaragod. The Chandragiri River empties into the Arabian Sea at Thalangara in Kasaragod town.

Tributaries 
The River Chandragiri's largest tributary is the Kudumbur River, which joins the Payaswini on its left bank east of Chattanchal.

See also 
 Kanhangad
 Kasaragod
 Mangalore

References

Rivers of Kasaragod district
Tourist attractions in Kasaragod district